Ponthan Mada is a 1994 Indian Malayalam-language film written and directed by T. V. Chandran. The film stars Mammootty and Naseeruddin Shah. It is based on two short stories, Ponthan Mada and Sheema Thampuran by C. V. Sreeraman. The film won four awards at the National Film Awards including the Best Actor award for Mammotty. It also won the Kerala State Film Award for the best second film. This is the only Malayalam-language film of Naseeruddin Shah. The film was a commercial success.

Plot
Set in the 1940s British India, the film is about the extraordinary, uncanny and touching relationship between the so-called low-caste Ponthan Mada and his colonial landlord Sheema Thampuran, who was expelled to British India from England during his youth for supporting the Irish Republican Army. Crossing the class boundaries, the two communicate through Thampuran's window with Mada hanging from an areca palm tree.

Cast
 Mammootty as Ponthan Mada
 Naseeruddin Shah as Sheema Thampuran
Laboni Sarkar
 Janardhanan
 Maniyanpilla Raju
 Sreejaya Nair
 Zeenath
 Mavelikkara Ponnamma
Premachandran

Soundtrack
ONV Kurup penned the lyrics.

"Madam Kondu Adimaranke" - K. S. Chitra

Awards
The film has won the following awards since its release:

1993 National Film Awards (India) 
 Golden Lotus Award - Best Director - T. V. Chandran
 Silver Lotus Award - Best Actor - Mammootty 
 Silver Lotus Award - Best Music Director - Johnson
 Silver Lotus Award - Best Cinematography - Venu

1994 Kerala State Film Awards (India) 
 Won - Kerala State Film Award for Second Best Film - Second Best Film

Other awards
 Muttathu Varkey Award (2016) - T. V. Chandran (for screenplay)

References

External links

1994 films
1994 drama films
1990s Malayalam-language films
Films directed by T. V. Chandran
Films scored by Johnson
Films whose director won the Best Director National Film Award
Films whose cinematographer won the Best Cinematography National Film Award
Films featuring a Best Actor National Award-winning performance
Films set in the British Raj
Films shot in Palakkad